Lively Grove is an unincorporated community in Johannisburg and Lively Grove Townships, Washington County, Illinois, United States.
Its main attraction is the Waller's Market.
A major local industry is the mining of coal.

References

Unincorporated communities in Washington County, Illinois
Unincorporated communities in Illinois